Glycoprotein endo-alpha-1,2-mannosidase (glucosylmannosidase, endo-alpha-D-mannosidase, endo-alpha-mannosidase, endomannosidase, glucosyl mannosidase) is an enzyme with systematic name glycoprotein glucosylmannohydrolase. This enzyme catalyses the following chemical reaction

 Hydrolysis of the terminal alpha-D-glucosyl-(1,3)-D-mannosyl unit from the GlcMan9(GlcNAc)2 oligosaccharide component of the glycoprotein produced in the Golgi membrane

This protein is involved in the synthesis of glycoproteins.

See also 
 MANEA

References

External links 
 

EC 3.2.1